Turu may refer to:

Turu people, an ethnic and linguistic group in Tanzania who speak the bantu language Kinyaturu
Turu language or Nyaturu language, a Bantu language

Given name and surname
Turu Flores or José Oscar Flores (born 1971), Argentine retired professional footballer
Turu Rizzo (1894–1961), Maltese water polo player
Charles Turu Tumahai (1949–1995), New Zealand singer, bass player and songwriter
István Turu (1962–2021), Hungarian boxer

Places
Turu, Iran, village in Sirik Rural District, Byaban District, Minab County, Hormozgan Province, Iran
Turu Island (두루섬), a large island in the Taedong River in Pyongyang, North Korea

See also 
Turu Cay, Queensland, a Torres Strait Island between Queensland, Australia and Papua New Guinea
TuRU Düsseldorf, German sports club (football and handball) from the city of Düsseldorf
Turu Qullu, a 4,309-metre-high (14,137 ft) mountain in the Bolivian Andes
Turu, the Wacky Hen, a 2019 Spanish-Argentine computer-animated film
Turku, Finland - the Estonian name of the town